SVNBridge is an extension for Microsoft Azure DevOps Server (formerly Team Foundation Server or TFS) that allows the use of a Subversion client (e.g., TortoiseSVN) with Azure DevOps Server. SVNBridge is available free under the Microsoft Public License (Ms-PL).

Overview
Svnbridge is an open source project hosted on the Microsoft Codeplex project site. Support for accessing Codeplex via subversion has been described by CodePlex as 'our number one requested feature'. SVNBridge allows developers to participate in CodePlex projects while still using Subversion based tools they are familiar with.

The SVNBridge project provides two related SVNBridge products with differing modes of operation:
 Either running as a client daemon (systray item) on Windows systems allowing Subversion applications on the client to access Azure DevOps revision control items on a remote Azure DevOps server.
 Or as an IIS web application on the Azure DevOps server itself; thus enabling Subversion clients to connect directly to the Azure DevOps server using the Subversion http protocols, and without requiring additional software on the client. In this latter mode it provided an interoperability solution for Unix/Linux/macOS based Subversion tools.

See also

 Comparison of Subversion clients

References

External links
 

Free and open-source software
Free software programmed in C Sharp
Microsoft free software
Apache Subversion
Software using the MS-PL license
2007 software
Windows-only free software